Fab Fox is the second studio album by Fujifabric, released in 2005 on the Capitol Records label.

Track listing
 
 "Sunny Morning"
  (Album Ver.) 
 
 
 
 
 
 
 
 "Birthday"

Chart positions

Fujifabric albums
2005 albums